The second season of The Voice of China is a Chinese reality talent show that premiered on 12 July 2013, on the Zhejiang Television sponsored by Jiaduobao. Harlem Yu and Na Ying returned as coaches for this season. Yang Kun and Liu Huan both left the show and were replaced by new coaches A-mei and Wang Feng.

Teams 
Colour key

Blind auditions 
 Color key

Episode 1 (12 July)

Episode 2 (19 July)

Episode 3 (26 July)

Episode 4 (2 August)

Episode 5 (9 August)
The fifth episode was broadcast on 9 August 2013. It is the last episode of blind auditions. This episode includes second chance contestants for whom none of the coaches had turned around previously.

The Battles 
Coaches begin narrowing down the playing field by training the contestants with the help of "trusted advisers." Each episode features battles consisting of pairings from within each team, and each battle concludes with the respective coach eliminating one of the two contestants. 'Steals' were introduced this season, where each coach could steal two contestants from another team when they lost their battle round.

Color key:

The Knockouts
In the Knockouts, each coach split his/her 9 remaining artists into groups of 3. After hearing a group sing their self-selected songs, the group's coach selected the best singer to advance to the Top 4 of his/her team. Each coach also had a one-time use of the "Double" button, which allowed him/her to select two singers from a group.

Color key:

The Playoffs
There are two rounds in this stage. In the first round, the four contestants have their own performances, and the coach decides on the contestant to advance to the final round. The remain artists were voted by the 101 media representatives. The artist with thelowest number of votes will be eliminated. In the second round, the two remaining contestants compete against each other, and the votes are decided by the media as well as the coach, who gives a total of 100 points for both contestants. The contestant with the highest number of votes advances to the next round. In the final round, the two remaining contestants compete against each other, and the votes system is the same with the second round. The contestant with the highest number of votes is the team champion.

 Colour key

Round 1

Round 2

Round 3

Final Concert - Winner Announced (Episode 15)
The season finale aired on Monday, October 7, 2013 which took place at Baoshan Stadium in Shanghai, China. Li Qi was named the winner.

Ratings

CSM46 Ratings

The data determined by CSM.

International broadcast
: CTi Variety
: TVB Good Show

References

Season 2
2010s Chilean television series
2013 Chinese television seasons